The Subaru EA engine is a series of automobile internal combustion engines manufactured by Subaru, a division of Fuji Heavy Industries. All EA series engines are of a flat-4 design, and have always been water cooled.

Design and history
Prior to 1966, Subaru was known for producing kei cars in Japan; for their first four-passenger model, the firm developed an air-cooled boxer engine for a prototype of the Subaru 1500 in 1960, but Fuji Heavy Industries was unable to continue development due to a shortage of funding. A new prototype front-wheel-drive car was built with a  water-cooled boxer engine, which became the basis for the Subaru 1000 and the EA-52 boxer engine. The car began sales to the public starting in 1966.

The EA series engines have aluminum heads with aluminum blocks. Each cylinder has two valves, one for exhaust and one for intake. They came in either an OHV pushrod or SOHC configuration.

Subaru produced the EA series from 1966 to 1994, and were found in the Subaru FF-1 Star, the Subaru Leone, the Subaru Brat (Brumby), the Subaru Loyale, the Subaru Omega (coupé), the Subaru Vortex, the Subaru RX, and the Subaru XT (Alcyone).

Models

EA-52
The Subaru EA-52 engine was produced from 1966 until 1970.

Found on
 Subaru 1000
 Subaru FF-1 Star
 Suzuki Karimun (first generation; Indonesia)

EA-53
The Subaru EA-53 was used in the 1967 Subaru 1000 Sports Sedan, sold in Japan. It used twin carburetors. This engine was used in the September 1968 Japan Alpine Rally which the car won in the 1000cc engine class.

EA-61

The Subaru EA-61 engine was produced from 1969 to 1972. The Japanese-spec Subaru FF-1 Sport Sedan and the FF-1 Super Touring sedan used twin carburetors, with the engine designation EA-61S. It was sold in the United States only for the 1971 model year. It was also briefly available in the first Leone, only in 1100 Van specification.

Found on
 Subaru FF-1 Star
 Subaru G
 1972–197? Subaru Leone A21 Van

EA-62
The Subaru EA-62 engine was produced from 1971 to 1972.  It is the only EA- engine with rear-facing exhaust ports.

Found on
 Subaru G (1300G in United States)

EA-62S
This engine used twin carburetors from Zenith-Stromberg.

Found on
 Subaru FF-1 1300G Sports Sedan and Super Touring (Japan)

EA-63
The Subaru EA-63 engine was produced from 1973 to 1979, although it stopped being used in US-market cars in 1976.

Found on
 1973-1979 Subaru Leone

EA-64
The Subaru EA-64 engine was produced from 1973 to 1979. The engine disappeared from the sedan catalogs in September 1975, as the new emissions regulations would simply make the car too slow. As commercial vehicles didn't have to meet the new stricter regulations, it continued to be available in the Van 1200 Standard until the end of production of the first generation Leone in 1979.

Found on
 1973-1975 Subaru Leone (sedan)
 1973-1977 Subaru Leone (van) A25
 1973-1979 Subaru Leone (van) A65

EA-65
The Subaru EA-65 engine was produced from 1979 to 1994.

Found on
 1979-1994 Subaru Leone for Japanese domestic market, Europe, Asia and Latin America.

EA-71
The Subaru EA-71 engine was produced in two different designs; from 1976 to 1994, originally the first design was a redesign of the EA-63 block, known as the "Narrow Case EA71" then Subaru completely redesigned it to make the newer version known as "Fat Case EA71" which also led to a stroked version known as the EA81. The availability in USA for the EA71 ended in 1990 on the hatchback models. It came with a carburetor and the last editions for JDM featured throttle-body injection, found on the "Maia" editions of the third generation Subaru Leone. The engine came either with solid lifters or hydraulic lifters.

Found on
 1976-1994 Subaru Leone
 1978-1980 Subaru BRAT
 1980-1990 Subaru Hatchback

EA-71S
This engine used twin Hitachi carburetors.

Found on
 1979-1981 Subaru Hatchback
 1979-1980 Subaru Brat
 1979-1983 Subaru Manatee (Race car, JDM)

EA-72 Concept Engine

There was an unreleased EA-72 concept engine Subaru developed for use in the Japanese Market in 1989.  It was essentially an EA-82 with an EA-71 crankshaft.  This engine never came about as the Subaru EJ15 and EJ16 were already in development for this purpose.

Specifications
 Displacement: 1,595 cc
 Bore: 92 mm
 Stroke: 60 mm
 Compression Ratio: 8.7:1
 Valvetrain: SOHC
 Horsepower: unreleased
 Torque: unreleased

EA-81

The Subaru EA-81 engine was produced from 1980 to 1994 and is a stroked version of the "Fat Case" EA-71 it came either with Solid Lifters or Hydraulic Lifters.

Found on
 1980-1989 Subaru Leone
 1981-1994 Subaru BRAT, Subaru Brumby
 1980-1990 Subaru Hatchback

EA-81S
This engine used twin Hitachi carburetors on a single intake manifold, and the late version for the 1983 Safari Rally, featured two downdraft Weber Carburetors, each one mounted directly over each head. The Heads and Valvetrain on the EA81S engines are different from the regular counterparts, featuring different positions for the intake and exhaust valves on the Heads, feature known usually as Reverse Valves.

Found on

 1980-1982 second gen Subaru Leone (Twin Hitachi Carbs)
 1980-1982 Second Gen Subaru Brat, Subaru Brumby (Twin Hitachi Carbs).
 1983 Subaru RX (Safari Rally Edition - Twin Weber Carbs)

EA-81T

The EA-81T is not an official engine designation from Subaru. The "T" is used informally to refer to the factory turbocharged version of EA-81 engines that are equipped with a turbocharger and multi port fuel injection. Boost pressure was 7 psi.

Found on
 1983-1984 Subaru Leone
 1983-1984 Subaru BRAT

EA-82

The Subaru EA-82 engine was originally intended to be a 2.0L engine as its prototypes were, but Subaru destroked it to 1.8L for production. The EA82 was produced from 1984 to 1994. It came either with carburetor, single point fuel injection, or multi port fuel injection and hydraulic lifters. Most of the technical advancements introduced to the EA82 were utilized in the next generation Subaru EJ engine, specifically, the SOHC valvetrain, and multi-point fuel injection.

Found on
 1984-1994 Third generation of Subaru Leone, Subaru Loyale, Subaru Omega
 1985-1991 Subaru Alcyone, Subaru XT, Subaru Vortex

EA-82T

The EA-82T engine was introduced in 1984 for the Third generation of Subaru Leone in the GL-10 and RX Turbo trim models plus the XT (Vortex), and later on the Subaru Leone RX Coupe models.  It is a turbocharged version of the MPFI EA-82 with modified cylinder heads, lower compression pistons, and boost pressure of 7 psi

A revised intake known as the "Spider" manifold was available and is seen as an early version of the EJ style intake manifold.

ER27

The ER series is a flat-6 engine with a displacement of 2.7L manufactured by Subaru, a division of Fuji Heavy Industries. The ER series has aluminium engine blocks and aluminium cylinder heads. It is found on the 1988-1991 Subaru Alcyone VX (XT-6 in the United States).

Created as a refined luxury engine with improved power over the EA82T, Subaru introduced the ER series engine in 1988 exclusively to be featured in the Subaru Alcyone VX. Like the EA series engines, the ER series engine featured 2-valve cylinder heads with hydraulic lash adjusters and the block shared the same bore and stroke. While recognised as bearing many similarities to the Subaru EA82 engine, there are numerous differences in design between the two engines and a large portion of parts are unique to the ER27. The oil and water pumps are unique to the ER27, sharing similar bolt patterns and design to the EA82, but being of a higher flow in both cases.
The intake manifold uses a two piece design with a lower section bolting to the heads containing the coolant bridge, injectors and various vacuum lines. The upper intake manifold then bolts to the lower section and is unlike the EA82 or EJ22 "spider" manifold designs in that there is no central plenum chamber. The valve timing system is belt-drive using two individual timing belts, curiously one belt uses a spring tensioner (like the EA82) whilst the other uses a hydraulic tensioner (like the EJ22). Both JDM and USDM versions of the ER27 used multi-point electronic fuel injection. The ER27 designation was the first time Subaru incorporated the engine's displacement into the series name and all future engines have retained this nomenclature.

References

 1977 Subaru Factory Service Manual
 1983 Subaru Factory Service Manual
 1984 Subaru Factory Service Manual
 1987/1988 Subaru Factory Service Manual
  Subaru Drive Magazine

Subaru engines
Boxer engines
Gasoline engines by model